Throwback may refer to:

 Atavism, or evolutionary throwback, a reversion to an ancestral type
 Throwback (drink), a 2009 brand of soft drink

Arts and entertainment 
 Throwback uniform, a sports uniform which mimics an older uniform of the team
 Throwback, a series of sculptures by American artist Tony Smith
 Throwback (1/3)
 Throwback (3/3)
 The Throwback (novel), a 1978 satirical novel written by Tom Sharpe
 Tecmo Bowl Throwback, a 2010 football video game

Film 
 The Throwback (unfinished film), an unfinished 1920 film
 The Throwback (1935 film), an American Western
 Throwback (2014 film), an Australian action horror

Music 
 Throwback, Vol. 1, a 2004 album by Boyz II Men
 "Throwback" (song), by Usher, 2004
 "Throw Back", a song by Royce da 5'9" from Death Is Certain
 Throwbacks (album), a 2013 soundtrack album for The Naked Brothers Band
 Throwback R&B, a radio format

Organizations 
 Throwback players, a University of Melbourne theater club
 Chicago Throwbacks, a team of the Premier Basketball League
 Throwback Entertainment, a Canadian video game developer

See also 
 Throwback Thursday, a social media trend